Pigi or Piyi may refer to:

 Pigi, Famagusta, a village in Cyprus
 Pigi, Rethymno, a village in Greece
 Pigi, Trikala, a village in Greece
 Pigi County, in South Sudan
 Hrysopiyi Devetzi, nicknamed Piyi, Greek athlete
 Piyi (crater), a crater on Mars
 Project I.G.I., or PIGI, a video game

See also 
 Piggy (disambiguation)